The Volvo PV60 is an automobile manufactured by Volvo between 1946 and 1950. It was the first car produced by the Swedish company after the end of the Second World War.

The development of the PV60 had started in 1939 and the car was introduced to the public alongside the smaller PV444 in September 1944. It was originally intended to be introduced in 1940, but it was delayed by the war. The large car was powered by a  inline 6 that produced . It was attached to a column-shifted three-speed manual transmission.

While the sales brochure described it as "en linjeren vagn i europeisk stil" (a clean line coach in European style), it bore a strong resemblance to a 1939 Pontiac, with the front being almost impossible to tell from the original. However, the Volvo was 10 cm shorter than the smallest Pontiac.

Production did not start until December 1946, and the majority of the cars were built in 1949 and 1950. In total, there were 3506 PV60s produced, about 500 of which were built into trucks or vans.

The smaller PV444 was more suited for the post-war economy and production of the PV60 halted in 1950. It would take almost two decades until Volvo introduced another upmarket six-cylinder car, the 164.

References
Volvo Personvagnar-från 20-tal till 80-tal by Björn-Eric Lindh, 1984.

Notes

External links 
Volvo Cars Heritage.
Volvo Museum.
Storvolvoklubben 

PV60
Cars introduced in 1946